Darreh Barik (also Romanized as Darreh Bārīk; also known as Darrehbārīk) is a village in Margha Rural District, in the Central District of Izeh County, Khuzestan Province, Iran. At the 2006 census, its population was 87, in 13 families.

References 

Populated places in Izeh County